Márcia Taffarel (born 15 March 1968) is a Brazilian former football midfielder who played for the Brazil women's national football team. She competed at the 1991 FIFA Women's World Cup and the 1996 Summer Olympics, playing 5 matches. At the club level, she played for EC Radar and Saad EC.

See also
 Brazil at the 1996 Summer Olympics

References

External links
 
 
 

1968 births
Living people
Brazilian women's footballers
Place of birth missing (living people)
Footballers at the 1996 Summer Olympics
Olympic footballers of Brazil
Women's association football midfielders
1991 FIFA Women's World Cup players
Brazil women's international footballers
Saad Esporte Clube (women) players
1995 FIFA Women's World Cup players